Bird is a 2017 Russian musical drama film, directorial debut of Ksenia Baskakova.

The film's title is a pun; the lead characters surname is Ptitsyn, which is similar to the Russian word, "Ptitsa" (Птица), meaning "bird".

Plot
All her life, teenage girl Katya (Evdokia Malevskaya) has to change hospitals because of having tuberculosis. Therefore, Katya has practically no friends, and the girl sees practically nothing except for the hospital walls. One day, a popular rock musician named Oleg (Ivan Okhlobystin) is admitted next room. The girl and the musician develop a close friendship which is to change both of their lives.

Cast
Ivan Okhlobystin - Oleg Ptitsyn
Evdokia Malevskaya - Katya
Anastasia Melnikova - mother of Katya
Kirill Zakharov - Chief Physician
Kirill Rubtsov - Mikhail
Inna Gorbikova - Marina
Garik Sukachov - angel

References

External links

2010s musical drama films
Russian musical drama films
2010s Russian-language films
Lenfilm films
2017 directorial debut films